The 1980 NAIA Division I football season was the 25th season of college football sponsored by the NAIA, was the 11th season of play of the NAIA's top division for football.

The season was played from August to November 1980 and culminated in the 1980 NAIA Division I Champion Bowl. The title game was played on December 20, 1980 at Burlington Memorial Stadium in Burlington, North Carolina, near the campus of Elon College.

Elon defeated Northeastern State in the Champion Bowl, 17–10, to win their first NAIA national title.

Conference standings

Conference champions

Postseason

See also
 1980 NAIA Division II football season
 1980 NCAA Division I-A football season
 1980 NCAA Division I-AA football season
 1980 NCAA Division II football season
 1980 NCAA Division III football season

References

 
NAIA Football National Championship